Dendrobium farmeri, commonly known as Farmer's dendrobium, and in Chinese as 石斛属 (shi hu shu), is a species of orchid native to Asia.

It is native to the Himalayas (Nepal, Bhutan, Assam, Arunachal Pradesh, India, Bangladesh) and Indochina (Thailand, Myanmar, Laos, Peninsular Malaysia, and Vietnam).

References

External links

farmeri
Orchids of Asia
Flora of East Himalaya
Flora of Indo-China
Orchids of Bangladesh
Orchids of Myanmar
Orchids of China
Orchids of India
Orchids of Laos
Orchids of Malaysia
Orchids of Nepal
Orchids of Thailand
Orchids of Vietnam
Flora of Peninsular Malaysia
Plants described in 1849